Clarence Nicholas "Nick" Saunders (born 14 September 1963) is a retired Bermudian high jumper.

He won a bronze medal at the 1982 Commonwealth Games and finished fifth at the 1988 Summer Olympics. In 1989 he held the Commonwealth record with 2.34 metres, but this was equalled by Dalton Grant. At the 1990 Commonwealth Games in Auckland, Saunders would jump 2.36 to take the Commonwealth record and the gold medal ahead of Grant. 2.36 metres remained Saunders' career best jump, and it is still a Bermudian record. Dalton Grant would later improve his personal best to 2.36 metres (2.37 metres indoor ).  He also still holds the national record for the 400 metres hurdles, set in 1994.

International competition record

References

External links

1963 births
Living people
People from Paget Parish
Bermudian male high jumpers
Olympic athletes of Bermuda
Athletes (track and field) at the 1984 Summer Olympics
Athletes (track and field) at the 1988 Summer Olympics
Athletes (track and field) at the 1992 Summer Olympics
Pan American Games competitors for Bermuda
Athletes (track and field) at the 1987 Pan American Games
Athletes (track and field) at the 1991 Pan American Games
Commonwealth Games gold medallists for Bermuda
Commonwealth Games bronze medallists for Bermuda
Commonwealth Games medallists in athletics
Athletes (track and field) at the 1982 Commonwealth Games
Athletes (track and field) at the 1990 Commonwealth Games
World Athletics Championships athletes for Bermuda
Universiade medalists in athletics (track and field)
Competitors at the 1982 Central American and Caribbean Games
Central American and Caribbean Games bronze medalists for Bermuda
Universiade medalists for Bermuda
Central American and Caribbean Games medalists in athletics
Medalists at the 1983 Summer Universiade
Medallists at the 1982 Commonwealth Games
Medallists at the 1990 Commonwealth Games